Hela Kunda Forest Park is a forest park in the Gambia. Established on January 1, 1954, it covers 101 hectares.

The estimate terrain elevation above sea level is 17 metres.

References
  

Protected areas established in 1954
Forest parks of the Gambia